Aurimas Majauskas (born 11 May 1993) is a Lithuanian professional basketball player for BC Budivelnyk of the European North Basketball League and the Champions League. He played college basketball for Sam Houston State from 2013 to 2017.

Professional career
After graduating from Sam Houston State Bearkats in 2017, on 29 August 2017 he signed with Serbian basketball team KK Dynamic. On 30 December 2017 he parted ways with Dynamic. Over nine 2017–18 season games of the Second Adriatic League, he averaged 5.4 points, 3.4 rebounds and 0.9 assists per game.

In December 2019, Majauskas signed with Njarðvík of the Icelandic Úrvalsdeild karla. He averaged 15.1 points and 7.0 rebounds in 10 games for Njarðvík before the rest of the season was canceled due to the coronavirus pandemic in Iceland.

On August 7, 2022, he has signed with BC Budivelnyk of the European North Basketball League.

References

External links
 RealGM Profile
 CBSSports Profile
 Gobearkats Profile
 FOX Sports Profile
 DraftExpress Profile
 Sports.Yahoo Profile
 ESPN Profile
 Lithuania statistics at National Basketball League
Icelandic statistics

1993 births
Living people
Basketball League of Serbia players
BC Budivelnyk players
KK Dynamic players
Lithuanian men's basketball players
Lithuanian expatriate basketball people in Iceland
Lithuanian expatriate basketball people in Serbia
Lithuanian expatriate basketball people in the United States
London Lions (basketball) players
Aurimas Majauskas
Power forwards (basketball)
People from Marijampolė
Sam Houston Bearkats men's basketball players
Aurimas Majauskas